The Ten Tour was a concert tour by the American rock band Pearl Jam to support its debut album, Ten. It was the band's first full-scale tour after a short tour of the United States in 1991.

History
Bassist Jeff Ament stated that "essentially Ten was just an excuse to tour". He added, "We told the record company, 'We know we can be a great band, so let's just get the opportunity to get out and play.'" Pearl Jam faced a relentless touring schedule for Ten. Drummer Dave Abbruzzese joined the band for Pearl Jam's live shows supporting the album. Halfway through its own planned North American tour, Pearl Jam cancelled the remaining dates in order to take a slot opening for the Red Hot Chili Peppers on the band's Blood Sugar Sex Magik tour in the fall of 1991 in North America. Former Red Hot Chili Peppers drummer Jack Irons had called the Red Hot Chili Peppers and asked the band to allow his friend Eddie Vedder's new group to open for the band on its forthcoming tour. The Smashing Pumpkins also accompanied the Red Hot Chili Peppers on the tour. With the Red Hot Chili Peppers playing shows at arenas rather than theaters, the promoters of the tour decided that Pearl Jam should be replaced with a more successful act. Nirvana was chosen to replace Pearl Jam on the tour, however, The Smashing Pumpkins left the concert bill and were replaced by Pearl Jam. Epic executive Michael Goldstone observed that "the band did such an amazing job opening the Chili Peppers tour that it opened doors at radio." The band filmed its video for "Even Flow" at its January 17, 1992 show at the Moore Theatre in Seattle.

In 1992, the band embarked on its first ever European tour. On March 13, 1992, at the Munich, Germany show at Nachtwerk, Pearl Jam played Ten in its entirety in order mid-way through its set. The band then came back and did another tour of North America. Goldstone noted that the band's audience expanded, saying that unlike before "everyone came." The band's manager, Kelly Curtis, stated, "Once people came and saw them live, this lightbulb would go on. Doing their first tour, you kind of knew it was happening and there was no stopping it. To play in the Midwest and be selling out these 500 seat clubs. Eddie could say he wanted to talk to Brett, the sound guy, and they'd carry him out there on their hands. You hadn't really seen that reaction from a crowd before..." When Pearl Jam came back for a second go-around in Europe the band appeared at the well-known Pinkpop Festival in the Netherlands on June 8, 1992. This concert became legendary when Vedder jumped from a TV-camera-mast right into the crowd. The band cancelled its remaining European dates after an appearance at the Roskilde Festival on June 26, 1992 due to a confrontation with security at that event as well as exhaustion. Regarding the situation, Ament said, "We'd been on the road over 10 months. I think there just came a point about half way through that tour it was just starting to get pretty intense. I mean just being away from home, being on the road all the time and being lonely or being depressed or whatever." After this tour, the band would go on to play the 1992 Lollapalooza tour with the Red Hot Chili Peppers, Soundgarden, and Ministry, among others.

During this time period, Pearl Jam became known for its intense live performances. Vedder participated in stage diving as well as crowd surfing. Looking back at this time, Vedder said:
It's hard for us to watch early performances, even though that's when people think we were on fire and young. Playing music for as long as I had been playing music and then getting a shot at making a record and at having an audience and stuff, it's just like an untamed force...a different kind of energy. And I find it kind of hard to watch those early performances because it's so just fucking, semi-testosterone-fueled or whatever. But it didn't come from jock mentality. It came from just being let out of the gates. And Jeff and Stone, their horse was just about to be put down when it was put in the race. And I was coming from the same place. So when they finally let us out of the gates, we didn't have a smooth, galvanized, streamlined gate . We were just rocking all over the place.

Tour dates
Information taken from various sources.

Band members
Jeff Ament – bass guitar
Stone Gossard – rhythm guitar
Mike McCready – lead guitar
Eddie Vedder – lead vocals
Dave Abbruzzese – drums

Songs performed

Originals
"Alive"
"Alone"
"Angel"
"Black"
"Breath"
"Deep"
"Dirty Frank" (snippet)
"Even Flow"
"Footsteps"
"Garden"
"Jeremy"
"Leash"
"Oceans"
"Once"
"Porch"
"Release"
"State of Love and Trust"
"Wash"
"Why Go"
"Yellow Ledbetter" (snippet)

Covers
"Baba O'Riley" (The Who)
"Brass in Pocket" (The Pretenders) (snippet)
"Crazy" (Seal) (snippet)
"Dolly Dagger" (Jimi Hendrix) (snippet)
"Driven to Tears" (The Police)
"Happy Birthday" (traditional)
"Help Me, Rhonda" (The Beach Boys) (snippet)
"Hunger Strike" (Temple of the Dog) (snippet)
"I Can't Explain" (The Who) (snippet)
"I've Got a Feeling" (The Beatles) live jam with Claytown Troupe
"My Generation" (The Who)
"Outshined" (Soundgarden) (snippet)
"Owner of a Lonely Heart" (Yes) (snippet)
"Pulled Up" (Talking Heads) (snippet)
"Rain" (The Beatles) (snippet)
"Redemption Song" (Bob Marley & The Wailers)
"Rockin' in the Free World" (Neil Young)
"School's Out" (Alice Cooper) (snippet)
"Shower the People" (James Taylor) (snippet)
"Smells Like Teen Spirit" (Nirvana) (snippet)
"Suggestion" (Fugazi)
"Sympathy for the Devil" (The Rolling Stones) (snippet)
"Three Little Birds" (Bob Marley & The Wailers) (snippet)
"Throw Your Arms Around Me" (Hunters & Collectors)
"When the Saints Go Marching In" (anonymous) (snippet)
"Where Do the Children Play?" (Cat Stevens) (snippet)
"Window Paine" (The Smashing Pumpkins)

References

1991 concert tours
1992 concert tours
Pearl Jam concert tours